Statistics of JSL Cup in the 1980 season.

Overview
It was contested by 20 teams, and Nippon Kokan won the championship.

Results

1st round
Yomiuri 3-2 Yamaha Motors
Furukawa Electric 3-2 Fujita Industries
Honda 3-0 Tanabe Pharmaceuticals
Yanmar Diesel 2-0 Fujitsu

2nd round
Hitachi 5-1 Sumitomo Metals
Yomiuri 1-3 Toyo Industries
Mitsubishi Motors 0-1 Furukawa Electric
Nissan Motors 2-0 Daikyo Oil
Nippon Steel 2-4 Nippon Kokan
Honda 0-1 Toshiba
Kofu 0-3 Yanmar Diesel
Teijin Matsuyama 4-2 Toyota Motors

Quarterfinals
Hitachi 4-1 Toyo Industries
Furukawa Electric 1-1 (PK 4–5) Nissan Motors
Nippon Kokan 1-0 Toshiba
Yanmar Diesel 1-2 Teijin Matsuyama

Semifinals
Hitachi 2-0 Nissan Motors
Nippon Kokan 2-1 Teijin Matsuyama

Final
Hitachi 1-3 Nippon Kokan
Nippon Kokan won the championship

References
 

JSL Cup
League Cup